Statistics of Swiss Super League in the 1955–56 season.

Overview
It was contested by 14 teams, and Grasshopper Club Zürich won the championship.

League standings

Results

Sources
 Switzerland 1955–56 at RSSSF

Swiss Football League seasons
Swiss
1955–56 in Swiss football